The wedding of Prince Charles (later King Charles III) and Camilla Parker Bowles (later Queen Camilla) took place in a civil ceremony at Windsor Guildhall, on 9 April 2005. The ceremony, conducted in the presence of the couple's families, was followed by a Church of England Service of Prayer and Dedication at St George's Chapel. The groom's parents, Queen Elizabeth II and Prince Philip, Duke of Edinburgh, did not attend the civil wedding ceremony, but were present at the Service of Prayer and Dedication and held a reception for the couple in Windsor Castle afterwards.

The marriage formalised the relationship between Charles and Camilla, and she became known as "Her Royal Highness The Duchess of Cornwall". The proceedings of the Service of Prayer and Dedication were covered by the BBC network. Notable figures in attendance included international political, religious, royal figures, and various celebrities. The wedding was described by the media as "A Fairy Tale for Grown-Ups."

Engagement and preparations
On 10 February 2005, it was announced that Camilla Parker Bowles and Charles, Prince of Wales, would marry on 8 April 2005, at Windsor Castle with a civil service followed by religious prayer. The Privy Council met on 2 March 2005 to give effect to the Queen's consent to the marriage, in conformance with the provisions of the Royal Marriages Act 1772. The government indicated that the marriage was not morganatic. After the engagement announcement, the couple were congratulated by Queen Elizabeth II and her husband, the Duke of Edinburgh. The Archbishop of Canterbury, Rowan Williams, issued a statement which read: "These arrangements have my strong support and are consistent with Church of England guidelines concerning remarriage which the Prince of Wales fully accepts as a committed Anglican and as prospective Supreme Governor of the Church of England." Prime Minister Tony Blair, Leader of the Opposition Michael Howard, Leader of the Liberal Democrats Charles Kennedy, Leader of the House of Commons Peter Hain, and the Prime Ministers of the other Commonwealth realms added their congratulations.

The Duchess' engagement ring is a Windsor family heirloom that belonged to Queen Elizabeth The Queen Mother. It has a 1920s platinum setting and it is composed of a square-cut central diamond flanked by six diamond baguettes.

A civil ceremony
A civil ceremony was presumably chosen to avoid potential controversy caused by the future supreme governor of the Church of England marrying a divorcée in a religious ceremony, Camilla Parker Bowles having divorced her first husband in 1995. In fact, the marriage of a divorced person whose ex-spouse is still living has been possible in the Church of England, at the discretion of the member of clergy conducting the ceremony, since 2002.

When Princess Anne married Timothy Laurence after having divorced Mark Phillips, she did so in the Church of Scotland. The remarriage of divorcés is not controversial in the Church of Scotland, which does not view marriage as a sacrament, and the sovereign has no constitutional role in the governance of the Church. The Prince of Wales and his bride did not elect this course of action.

Questioning a royal civil wedding
Charles is the first member of the royal family to marry in a civil ceremony in England. Stephen Cretney, a Fellow at All Souls College, Oxford, questioned whether Charles and Camilla could marry in a civil ceremony, as the Royal Family was specifically excluded from the law which instituted civil marriages in England (Marriage Act 1836). On 14 February the BBC's Panorama  uncovered documents of official legislative research advice dating from 1956 and 1964, which stated that it was not lawful for members of the royal family to marry in a civil ceremony in England and Wales, though it would be lawful in Scotland. These documents' statements were dismissed in a statement published by Clarence House on the advice of four unnamed legal experts. It took the view that the 1836 Act had been repealed by the Marriage Act 1949. Lord Falconer of Thoroton, Secretary of State for Constitutional Affairs and Lord Chancellor, made the following statement:The Government are satisfied that it is lawful for the Prince of Wales and Mrs Parker-Bowles, like anyone else, to marry by a civil ceremony in accordance with Part III of the Marriage Act 1949. Civil marriages were introduced in England, by the Marriage Act 1836. Section 45 said that the Act "... shall not extend to the marriage of any of the Royal Family". But the provisions on civil marriage in the 1836 Act were repealed by the Marriage Act 1949. All remaining parts of the 1836 Act, including Section 45, were repealed by the Registration Service Act 1953. No part of the 1836 Act therefore remains on the statute book. ... We are aware that different views have been taken in the past; but we consider that these were overcautious, and we are clear that the interpretation I have set out in this Statement is correct. We also note that the Human Rights Act has since 2000 required legislation to be interpreted wherever possible in a way that is compatible with the right to marry (Article 12) and with the right to enjoy that right without discrimination (Article 14). This, in our view, puts the modern meaning of the 1949 Act beyond doubt.Professor Rebecca Probert has subsequently argued that Charles and Camilla's wedding is not legal. She says that it was not possible, as the government claimed, for such a drastic change in the law to have been implemented by the 1949 Act because it was introduced under a specially authorised procedure that can only be used in respect of "Consolidation Acts", acts which bring together the law previously contained in a number of statutes into one statute without changing it in any major way. Probert argues that article 79(5), which reads: "Nothing in this Act shall affect any law or custom relating to the marriage of members of the Royal Family.", still holds, on these grounds.

The government raised the issue of the Human Rights Act, noting that under this the 1949 Act had to be interpreted wherever possible to uphold the right to marry without discrimination. The key words are "wherever possible" - the Human Rights Act specifically states that where a statute makes something illegal the only way to make it legal is to amend or repeal the statute. For example, were the Sovereign to deny a member permission to marry under the Royal Marriages Act, an application to the Court for a declaration that the marriage must be permitted to go ahead under human rights legislation would fail. 

Eleven objections were received by the Cirencester and Chippenham register offices but were all rejected by the Registrar General (and National Statistician) Len Cook, who determined that a civil marriage would in fact be valid.

Change of the wedding location and date
On 17 February, Clarence House announced the marriage's change of venue from Windsor Castle to the Windsor Guildhall, immediately outside the walls of the castle. This substitution came about when it was discovered that the legal requirements for licensing the royal castle for civil weddings would require opening it up to other prospective couples for at least three years. On 22 February, Buckingham Palace announced that the Queen would not attend the wedding ceremony, but would attend the church blessing and host the reception afterwards. The reason stated by the palace was the couple wanted to keep the occasion low key. On 4 April, it was announced that the wedding would be postponed 24 hours until 9 April, so that the Prince of Wales could attend the funeral of Pope John Paul II as the representative of the Queen. The postponement also allowed some of the dignitaries who were invited to the funeral to attend the wedding. In keeping with tradition, the Prince of Wales spent the night apart from his bride-to-be at Highgrove House, his country home in Gloucestershire, with his sons Princes William and Harry, while Camilla remained at Clarence House.

Wedding and Service of Prayer and Dedication
The wedding took place at the Windsor Guildhall at 12.30 pm BST (11:30 UTC) on Saturday 9 April 2005. Crowds had gathered on the streets since dawn ahead of the service. The ceremony was attended by senior members of the royal family apart from the Queen and the Duke of Edinburgh.

After the wedding, the couple's witnesses were Prince William of Wales and Tom Parker Bowles, sons of the groom and bride respectively. In keeping with tradition, the couple's wedding rings are crafted from 22 carat Welsh gold from the Clogau St David's mine in Bontddu. The tradition of using Clogau Gold within the wedding rings of the Royal Family dates back to 1923. The design of the wedding rings is by Wartski, a London jeweller that has held the Royal Warrant to the Prince of Wales since 1979. The prince wears his on the small finger of his left hand.

The civil wedding was followed by a televised blessing, officially termed a Service of Prayer and Dedication by both the Prince of Wales's office and the press. in the afternoon at St George's Chapel, Windsor Castle. This was attended by 800 guests and all the senior members of the royal family, including the Queen and the Duke of Edinburgh, and led by the Archbishop of Canterbury Rowan Williams.  During this ceremony Charles and Camilla joined the congregation in reading "the strongest act of penitence from the 1662 Book of Common Prayer", widely quoted in press reports of the wedding:We acknowledge and bewail our manifold sins and wickedness, Which we, from time to time, most grievously have committed, by thought, word and deed, Against thy Divine Majesty, Provoking most justly thy wrath and indignation against us.

The arrangements for the wedding and service were strongly supported by the Archbishop of Canterbury as "consistent with the Church of England guidelines concerning remarriage". The "strongly-worded" act of penitence recited by the couple was a confessional prayer written by Thomas Cranmer, Archbishop of Canterbury to King Henry VIII. It was interpreted as a confession by both, of past sins, albeit without specific reference and going "some way towards acknowledging concerns" over their past misdemeanours.

For the wedding, the Duchess wore a cream-coloured dress and coat with a wide-brimmed cream-coloured hat. For the Service of Prayer and Dedication afterward, she wore a floor-length embroidered pale blue and gold coat over a matching chiffon dress and a dramatic spray of golden feathers in her hair. Both ensembles were by Antonia Robinson and Anna Valentine, London designers who worked under the name Robinson Valentine, now solely called Anna Valentine; both hats were made by the Irish milliner Philip Treacy.
The Duchess's flower bouquet contained daffodils, jasmine, Lily of the Valley, pink and cream lilies, camellias, hydrangeas, and roses which came from the Prince of Wales Highgrove House gardens. Charles and all male members of the royal family wore morning dress. The wedding cake was made by Mrs Blunden, owner of the "Sophisticake" cake shop in Woodhall Spa, Lincolnshire. In April 2005 a hotelier paid £215 in an internet auction for a slice of the cake.

Following the service of blessing, the couple greeted the people who had lined outside the chapel. The party then moved to Windsor Castle's State Apartments where the Queen hosted a reception for a number of guests. The couple later went to Birkhall on the Balmoral Estate for their honeymoon.

Public and commercial interest
Manufacturers of pottery and other commemorative items faced a late rush to change the dates on their products after the delayed wedding date became known. However, sales of those with the incorrect date soared when people began to think that they would become collectors' items. For the wedding day, the theme park Alton Towers changed the name of their rollercoaster "Rita: Queen of Speed" to "Camilla: Queen of Speed". Television commercials and signs around the park were all updated to reflect this change.

The BBC gained the rights to broadcast the event where there was live coverage of the Service of Prayer and Dedication from St George's Chapel. On BBC One, Dermot Murnaghan and Sophie Raworth presented the live coverage of the event and fashion advisors Trinny Woodall and Susannah Constantine contributed as the contemporary social commentators. The BBC had around thirty cameras at the event and shared footage with broadcasters throughout the world. BBC News 24 also had coverage during the day with Jane Hill and Simon McCoy reporting live from Windsor.

Many self-described fans of Diana, Princess of Wales opposed the wedding of Charles and Camilla Parker Bowles, with some referring to the event as "Black Thursday" and writing to national newspapers to express their disapproval.

Wedding guest list
According to a list released by the office of Prince Charles:

Family of the Prince of Wales
The Prince of Wales' sons:
 Prince William of Wales, the groom's son
 Prince Harry of Wales, the groom's son
 The Princess Royal and Vice Admiral Sir Tim Laurence, the groom's sister and brother-in-law
 Peter Phillips, the groom's nephew
 Zara Phillips, the groom's niece
 The Duke of York, the groom's brother
 Princess Beatrice of York, the groom's niece
 Princess Eugenie of York, the groom's niece
 The Earl and Countess of Wessex, the groom's brother and sister-in-law
The Princess Margaret, Countess of Snowdon's family:
Viscount and Viscountess Linley, the groom's first cousin and his wife
Lady Sarah and Daniel Chatto, the groom's first cousin and her husband
Princess Alexandra, The Honourable Lady Ogilvy, the groom's first cousin, once removed

Family of Camilla Parker Bowles
 Major Bruce Shand, the bride's father
 Camilla Parker Bowles' children and their partners:
 Tom Parker Bowles and Sara Buys, the bride's son and his fiancée
 Laura Parker Bowles and Harry Lopes, the bride's daughter and her partner
 Annabel and Simon Elliot, the bride's sister and her husband
 Ben Elliot, the bride's nephew
 Alice and Luke Irwin, the bride's niece and her husband
 Katie Elliot, the bride's niece
 Mark Shand, the bride's brother

Blessing guest list
According to official press package:

Members of the British Royal Family
The Queen and The Duke of Edinburgh, the groom's parents
The Prince of Wales' sons:
 Prince William of Wales
 Prince Harry of Wales
 The Princess Royal and Vice Admiral Sir Tim Laurence, the groom's sister and brother-in-law
 Peter Phillips, the groom's nephew
 Zara Phillips, the groom's niece
 The Duke of York, the groom's brother
 Princess Beatrice of York, the groom's niece
 Princess Eugenie of York, the groom's niece
 The Earl and Countess of Wessex, the groom's brother and sister-in-law
The Princess Margaret, Countess of Snowdon's family:
Viscount and Viscountess Linley, the groom's first cousin and his wife
Lady Sarah and Daniel Chatto, the groom's first cousin and her husband
 The Duke and Duchess of Gloucester, the groom's first cousin, once removed, and his wife
 The Duke and Duchess of Kent, the groom's first cousin, once removed, and his wife
 Princess Alexandra, The Honourable Lady Ogilvy, the groom's first cousin, once removed
 James and Julia Ogilvy, the groom's second cousin and his wife
 Prince and Princess Michael of Kent, the groom's first cousin, once removed, and his wife

Viceroys
 The Governor-General of Antigua and Barbuda and Lady Carlisle
 The Governor-General of Australia and Mrs Jeffery
 The Governor-General of Barbados and Mrs Husbands
 The Governor-General of Canada and John Ralston Saul
 The Queen's Representative in the Cook Islands and Lady Goodwin
 The Governor-General of Grenada and Lady Williams
 The Commonwealth Secretary-General and Clare de Lore
 The Governor-General of New Zealand and Peter Cartwright
 The Governor-General of Papua New Guinea and Lady Matane
 The Governor-General of St. Kitts and Nevis

Foreign royalty

Members of reigning royal families
  The King of Bahrain 
  Prince Constantijn and Princess Laurentien of the Netherlands (representing the Queen of the Netherlands)
  The Crown Prince and Crown Princess of Norway (representing the King of Norway)
  Prince Turki bin Faisal Al Saud and Princess Nouf of Saudi Arabia (representing the King of Saudi Arabia)
  Prince Bandar bin Sultan of Saudi Arabia

Members of non-reigning royal families
 King Constantine II and Queen Anne-Marie of the Hellenes
 Princess Margareta and Prince Radu of Romania
 Crown Prince Alexander and Crown Princess Katherine of Yugoslavia

British politicians
 The Prime Minister of the United Kingdom and Mrs Blair
 The Conservative Party Leader and Mrs Howard
 The Liberal Democrat Leader and Mrs Kennedy
 The First Minister of Scotland and Mrs McConnell
 The First Minister for Wales and Mrs Morgan
 The Secretary of State for Northern Ireland

Religious representatives
 The Archbishop of Canterbury and Dr Williams
 The Lord and Lady Carey of Clifton
 The Dean of Windsor and wife
 Canon Doctor Hueston Finlay and wife
 Canon Laurence Gunner and wife
 Canon John Ovenden and Christine Ovenden
 Rev Canon John White

Other notable guests
Andrew Parker Bowles, and Rosemary Parker Bowles, the bride's first husband and his second wife
Lord and Lady Romsey, the groom's second cousin and his wife
 Christopher Warren-Green, conductor
 David Frost, broadcaster
 Edward Fox, actor and Joanna David
 Gordon Hunt, musician
 Jilly Cooper, novelist
 Joan Rivers, comic
 Joanna Lumley, actress and ambassador for Prince's Trust
 Jonathan Dimbleby, British presenter
 Martina Milburn, chief executive of the Prince's Trust
 Lord Bragg, broadcaster and author
 Nicholas Soames, shadow defence secretary
 Paddy Campbell, fashion designer
 Philip Treacy, milliner
 Prunella Scales, actress
 Richard E. Grant, actor
 Robert Harris, author
 Ronald Harwood, playwright
 Sanjeev Bhaskar, actor
 Simon Sebag Montefiore, biographer, novelist and journalist
 Sir Stephen Lamport, former private secretary to the prince
 Timothy West, actor
 Trudie Styler, actor and producer
 Valentino Garavani, fashion designer
 William Shawcross, writer and broadcaster
 William Rees-Mogg, former editor of The Times
 Staff from Clarence House, Highgrove House, Birkhall and Sandringham

References

External links

Official website of the Prince of Wales - Details of the wedding and blessing ceremony
BBC News – In Depth: Charles and Camilla
BBC ONE - The Royal Wedding of HRH The Prince of Wales and Camilla Parker Bowles
CNN – Royal Wedding
Guardian Unlimited – In Pictures: Charles and Camilla
Daily Telegraph article including Guest Lists
Town & Country -- Remembering Prince Charles and Camilla's Wedding Day

Camilla, Queen Consort
Charles III
Charles, Prince Of Wales and Camilla Parker Bowles
2005 in England
Marriage, unions and partnerships in England
History of Berkshire
Windsor, Berkshire
Windsor Castle
House of Windsor
2000s in Berkshire
April 2005 events in the United Kingdom
Charles, Prince Of Wales and Camilla Parker Bowles